James Hyde may refer to:

James Hyde (actor) (born 1962), American actor
James Hyde (artist) (born 1958), American painter, sculptor and photographer
James Franklin Hyde (1903–1999), American chemist
James F. C. Hyde (1825–1898), American politician from Massachusetts
James Hazen Hyde (1876–1959), American businessman
James M. Hyde (1873–1943), American metallurgist
James S. Hyde (born 1932), American biophysicist